"Not for a Moment (After All)" is a song by Christian Contemporary-Modern Worship musician Meredith Andrews from her fourth studio album, Worth It All. It was released on July 31, 2012, as the first single from the album.

Composition 
"Not for a Moment (After All)" was written by Meredith Andrews, Mia Fieldes and Jacob Sooter.

Release 
"Not for a Moment (After All)" was digitally released as the lead single from Worth It All on July 31, 2012.

Charts

References 

2012 singles
2012 songs
Word Records singles
Songs written by Mia Fieldes